Middendorp is a surname. Notable people with the surname include:
 Ernst Middendorp (born 1958), German football manager
 Geertruida Middendorp (1911–2007), Dutch Resistance member
 Jakob Middendorp (c. 1537–1611), Dutch Catholic theologian and churchman
 Tom Middendorp (born 1960), Dutch four-star general